Victoria Azarenka was the defending champion, but did not participate this year as she was on maternity leave.

Elena Vesnina won the title, defeating Svetlana Kuznetsova in the final, 6–7(6–8), 7–5, 6–4. This was the second all-Russian women's singles final at this event (the first was in 2006).

Due to the pre-tournament withdrawal of Serena Williams, Angelique Kerber regained the World No. 1 ranking at the end of the tournament.

Seeds
All seeds receive a bye into the second round.

Draw

Finals

Top half

Section 1

Section 2

Section 3

Section 4

Bottom half

Section 5

Section 6

Section 7

Section 8

Qualifying

Seeds

Qualifiers

Lucky loser

Draw

First qualifier

Second qualifier

Third qualifier

Fourth qualifier

Fifth qualifier

Sixth qualifier

Seventh qualifier

Eighth qualifier

Ninth qualifier

Tenth qualifier

Eleventh qualifier

Twelfth qualifier

External links
 Main draw
 Qualifying draw

Women's Singles